Ernest Evans (21 August 1861 – 4 November 1948) was an English cricketer who played for Somerset. He was born and died in Clifton, Bristol.

Evans made one first-class appearance for Somerset, during the 1891 season, against Gloucestershire. In the single innings in which he batted, he was bowled by Frederick Roberts for a duck.

Evans' brother, David played for Gloucestershire and Somerset.

External links
Ernest Evans at Cricket Archive  

1861 births
1948 deaths
English cricketers
Somerset cricketers
Cricketers from Bristol